Sanborn's bonneted bat (Eumops hansae), is a bat species from South and Central America. It was first described from a specimen collected at Colonia Hansa, Brazil, and is sometimes also known as the Hansa bonneted bat.

Description
They have rich blackish-brown fur, which is paler on the belly, and which allows it to be distinguished from the similarly sized, but more lightly coloured, dwarf bonneted bats that live in the same general area. Other distinctive features of the species include narrow wing tips, relatively well-developed teeth at the back of the jaw, and a higher jaw joint than in its close relatives.

Distribution and behaviour
Sanborn's bonneted bat is patchily distributed across Central America, and is also found in the southernmost tip of Mexico. In South America, it is found across the northern parts of the continent east of the Andes, including Colombia, Venezuela, the Guyanas, western Brazil, eastern Peru and Ecuador, and northern Bolivia. Within this region it inhabits lowland tropical evergreen forests below about  elevation. There are no recognised subspecies.

Sanborn's bonneted bats eat Orthopterans and other insects, which they catch while flying in the upper levels of the forest canopy. They have also been observed flying over clearings and large bodies of water, and to roost in cavities in tree cavities.

References

Eumops
Mammals of Colombia
Mammals described in 1932
Taxa named by Colin Campbell Sanborn
Bats of South America
Bats of Central America